Carmen Susana Simões (born 8 March 1973, in Lisbon, Portugal) is a Portuguese singer and lyricist of darkwave and gothic music, characterized by a melancholic mezzo-soprano voice.

Carmen began her musical career in local Gothic rock bands known as 'Poetry of Shadows' and 'Isiphilon'. In 1997, Carmen soon became the lead singer of the prestigious darkwave band Aenima. As of 2005, next to the award winning musician Rune Eriksen, she became the vocalist for the Doom metal band Ava Inferi, where she would also participate in a Moonspell album, in 2007.

As of 2013, Rune Eriksen and Carmen Susana Simões announced the disbandment of Ava Inferi.

Discography
with Isiphilon
 Essence (1997)

with Aenima
 Revolutions (1999)
 Never Fragile - EP (2002)
 Sentient (2003)

with Ava Inferi
 Burdens (2006)
 The Silhouette (2007) 
 Blood Of Bacchus (2009)
 Onyx (2011)

References

1973 births
Living people
Portuguese mezzo-sopranos
Singers from Lisbon
Women heavy metal singers
20th-century Portuguese women singers
21st-century Portuguese women singers